The 2014 Bank of the West Classic was a professional tennis tournament played on hard courts. It was the 43rd edition of the tournament, which was part of the WTA Premier tournaments of the 2014 WTA Tour. It took place in Stanford, United States between 28 July and 3 August 2014. It was the first women's event on the 2014 US Open Series.

Points and prize money

Point distribution

Prize money 
The total commitment prize money for this year's event was $710,000

Singles main-draw entrants

Seeds

 1 Rankings are as of July 21, 2014

Other entrants
The following players received wildcards into the singles main draw:
  Kristie Ahn
  Victoria Azarenka
  Venus Williams

The following players received entry from the qualifying draw:
  Paula Kania
  Naomi Osaka
  Sachia Vickery
  Carol Zhao

Withdrawals
Before the tournament
  Sara Errani --> replaced by CoCo Vandeweghe
  Petra Kvitová --> replaced by Kimiko Date-Krumm

Retirements
  Yanina Wickmayer (viral illness)

Doubles main-draw entrants

Seeds

1 Rankings are as of July 21, 2014

Withdrawals
During the tournament
  Aleksandra Wozniak (viral illness)

Finals

Singles

  Serena Williams defeated  Angelique Kerber,  7–6(7–1), 6–3

Doubles

  Garbiñe Muguruza /  Carla Suárez Navarro defeated  Paula Kania /  Kateřina Siniaková, 6–2, 4–6, [10–5]

References

External links
 Official website

Bank of the West Classic
Silicon Valley Classic
Sports in Stanford, California
Bank of the West Classic
Bank of the West Classic
Bank of the West Classic